Indigo Algorithm -Ai no Denshi Kisuuhou- (Indigo Algorithm－藍の電思基数法－), also known as Quantum Mechanics Rainbow II: Indigo Algorithm, is the seventh (sixth of entirely new music) solo album by artist Daisuke Asakura. It is the second in a series of seven albums released by Asakura in 2004, called Quantum Mechanics Rainbow. Each album revolves around a different color of the rainbow and a different term relating to Quantum Mechanics. This album revolves around the color indigo. The album also contains a re-arrangement of a song originally performed by another, now defunct, band that Daisuke Asakura had produced in the past, The Seeker. It also contains guest vocals by Takatoshi Shindo (Track 5).

Track listing

All songs produced, composed and arranged by Daisuke Asakura

References
 Official Daisuke Asakura Profile
 Daisuke Asakura Discography on Sony Music Japan
 Scans of the album, used for album cover and guest vocal information

2004 albums
Daisuke Asakura albums